Jesse Michael Salomon (born 1976) is a Democratic State Senator representing the 32nd Legislative District in Washington.

Career
Salomon won the election on 6 November 2018. He secured sixty-nine percent of the vote while incumbent Democrat Maralyn Chase secured thirty-one percent.

References

Democratic Party Washington (state) state senators
Living people
21st-century American politicians
1976 births